The creation of the Tryon County, New York militia was authorized on March 8, 1772, when the Province of New York passed a bill for the establishment of organized militia in each county in the colony. By 1776 (at the start of the American War of Independence), the Tryon County militia had in effect become an army of rebellion under the control of the Tryon County Committee of Safety. The Tryon County militia would go on to fight at the important battles of Oriskany and Johnstown (among others) during the war.

Militia regiments
Early in 1772, the Colony of New York passed a bill for the establishment of organized militia in each county. In 1775, the Tryon County militia comprised four regiments, organized according to geographical location:
 1st regiment: Canajoharie District
 2nd regiment: Palatine District
 3rd regiment: Mohawk District
 4th regiment: German Flatts & Kingsland Districts

Expansion
A 5th regiment from the Harpersfield area was created under the command of a local resident, Colonel John Harper on March 3, 1780. Three companies were designated, falling under the commands of: Captain Alexander Harper, Captain Daniel McGillevrey, and Captain Lodwick Breakman. Before they fled to the Canadian Provinces in 1775, Daniel Claus, Sir John Johnson and Guy Johnson were each colonels in command of these regiments.

On August 22, 1775, by order of the New York Provincial Congress, the militias of Tryon County and Albany County were joined to form a brigade. One fourth of each company were selected as minutemen.

Wartime
On October 5, 1776, a resolution of the New York State congress appointed Nicholas Herkimer as brigadier general of the "Brigade of Militia of Tryon County, New York."

On August 6, 1777, the militia, under the command of Herkimer, fought in the Battle of Oriskany with British forces (under the command of Barry St. Leger, Sir John Johnson, Colonel John Butler, and Captain Joseph Brant). While British casualties were high, the Tryon County militia suffered a casualty rate of almost 70%

In 1779, the Tryon County militia was combined with the Albany County militia. On March 20, 1780, Brigadier General Robert Van Rensselaer was given command of a brigade of militia which included the Tryon County militia. In 1781, Marinus Willett was given over-all command of the Tryon County, New York militia.

Organization

1st Regiment

The first regiment, or battalion, of the Tryon County Militia was first commanded by Colonel Nicholas Herkimer, later promoted to Brigadier General then was replaced by Colonel Ebenezer Cox (who was wounded and taken prisoner of war in the first volleys of the Battle of Oriskany on August 6, 1777).and Captain Samuel Campbell was promoted to Colonel to fill the vacancy. Companies included those of Captain Abraham Coapman who was later promoted to Major and replaced Johan Joseph House; Captain Henry Diefendorf, who was killed on the Oriskany Battlefield on August 6, 1777 and replaced by his brother, Jacob Dievendorf (died 11/23/1816); Captain Michael Grass who later deserted; and Jost Dygert.

2nd Regiment
The second regiment, or battalion, of the Tryon County Militia was commanded by Colonel Jacob Klock.
Officers of the second regiment under the command of Colonel Klock included Captain William W. Fox, his son Captain Christopher W. Fox, Captain Christian House, and Captain Nicholas Richtor.

3rd Regiment
The third regiment, or battalion, of the Tryon County Militia was commanded by Colonel Frederick Fisher, or Visscher. Lieutenant Colonels were Adam Fonda and Volkert Veeder. Majors were John Bliven and John Nukerk. Adjutants were Robert Yates, Peter Conyn, John G. Lansingh, Jr., and Gideon Marlett. Quarter Masters were Theodorus F. Romine, Abraham Van Horn, and Simon Veeder. Surgeons were John George Folke and Surgeon William Petry, and Philip Cromwell Jr. (aka Jan Philipse Cromwell).

Eight companies constituted the third regiment. As of 26 Aug 1775 these were led by the following:
1st Company - Captain Jacob Gardinier, 1st Lieutenant Abraham D. Quackenbus, 2nd Lieutenant William Hall, Ensign Gideon Marlat.
2nd Company - Captain John Davis, 1st Lieutenant Abraham Vedder, 2nd Lieutenant Jacob Simon.
3rd Company - Captain Robert Yates, 1st Lieutenant Cobus Cromwell, 2nd Lieutenant Peter Yates, Ensign Hendrick Lewis.
4th Company - Captain John Fisher, 1st Lieutenant John Wemple, 2nd Lieutenant Mindert W. Quackenbush, Ensign Gerrit Gysbertse VanBrocklin.
5th Company - Captain Samuel Pettingell, Lieutenant Thomas Caine, Ensign Samuel Barnhard, Jr.
6th Company - Captain Abner French, Lieutenant David McMaster, Ensign Peter VanderLenden.
7th Company - Captain Lewis Crout, 1st Lieutenant Jeremiah Swarts, 2nd Lieutenant Christian Carnest, Ensign Emanuel DeGraff.
8th Company - Captain Abraham Hodges, 1st Lieutenant Joseph Yeamans, 2nd Lieutenant Abel Hunt, Ensign Amos Bennet.

4th Regiment
The fourth regiment, or battalion, of the Tryon County Militia was commanded initially by Col. Hansyoot Herkimer, and after his death in 1775, by Colonel Peter Bellinger, formerly lieutenant colonel of the regiment.

Minutemen
Sixty men served as minutemen under Colonel Samuel Campbell and Captain Francis Utt.

Associated Exempts
A company of exempted soldiers acted as a home guard under the command of Captain Jellis Fonda.

Rangers
Rangers were raised for service in their home counties: "unless called forth for the defence of a neighboring County or State by the Mutual Consent of the bordering County Committees of the respective Counties or States".

On July 23, 1776, by order of the Provincial Congress of New York, three ranger companies were established under the commands of:

 Mark Demuth
 Christian Getman
 John Winn

These ranger companies were disbanded on March 27, 1777

On July 17, 1777, by order of the Provincial Congress of New York, two ranger companies were established under the commands of:

 John Harper
 James Clyde

Footnotes

References
 Berry, A.J., A Time of Terror, 2005, 
 
 DRCHSNY, Vol.1 Fernow, Bethold, Documents Relating to the Colonial History of the State of New York: Volume XV: State Archives Series, Volume 1., 1887 [DRCHSNY]. Weed, Parsons, & Company: Albany, New York, 1887"
 Fonte, Allan, Liberty March, The Battle of Oriskany, 1998, 
 Fort Plank Historian, Ken D. Johnson, The Bloodied Mohawk'', Picton Press, Rockport, Maine, 2000, .
 Pettingell, James Mason, "A Pettingell Genealogy", The Fort Mill Press, Boston, Mass., 1906,

External links
Bibliography of the Continental Army in New York; compiled by the United States Army Center of Military History
 Fort Plank: Bastion of My Freedom

New York (state) militia
Albany militia